Harpadon squamosus, the scaly lizardfish, is a species of lizardfish that lives mainly in the coasts around India.

References
 

Synodontidae
Fish described in 1891